Filip Dvořák (born March 9, 1997) is a Czech professional ice hockey player. He is currently playing for HC ZUBR Přerov of the Czech 1.liga.

Dvořák made his Czech Extraliga debut playing with HC Kometa Brno during the 2015-16 Czech Extraliga season.

References

External links

1997 births
Living people
HC Kometa Brno players
HC ZUBR Přerov players
Czech ice hockey forwards
Ice hockey people from Brno